Manfred Panuschka (born 17 October 1960) is an Austrian sailor. He competed in the Flying Dutchman event at the 1984 Summer Olympics.

References

External links
 

1960 births
Living people
Austrian male sailors (sport)
Olympic sailors of Austria
Sailors at the 1984 Summer Olympics – Flying Dutchman
Place of birth missing (living people)